Ieronim Petrovich Uborevich (– 12 June 1937) was a Soviet military commander  of the Red Army during the Russian Civil War, reaching the rank of komandarm in 1935. He was executed during the Great Purge in June 1937 and was posthumously rehabilitated in 1957.

Biography
Uborevich was born into a Lithuanian peasant family in the village of Antandraja in the Novoalexandrovsky Uyezd of the Kovno Governorate of the Russian Empire (present-day Utena District Municipality, Lithuania).

He joined the Russian Social Democratic Labour Party (b) in 1917 and, after the October Revolution, began recruiting Red Guards in Bessarabia. During Operation Faustschlag in March 1918 he was injured and taken captive by the Central Powers. He escaped in August, joined the Red Army, and served as an artillery instructor and commander of the Dvinsk Brigade on the Northern Front. In December 1918 he received command of the 18th Rifle Division of the 6th Army.

During the Russian Civil War, he held several significant commands, including: commander of the 14th Army of the Southern Front and the Southwestern Front (6 October 1919 – 24 February 1920, 17 April – 7 July 1920, and 15 November – 15 December 1920); commander of the 9th Kuban Army of the Southern Front (1 March – 5 April 1920); commander of the 13th Army of the Southern Front (10 July – 11 November 1920); and commander of the 5th Army of the Eastern Front (27 August 1921 – 14 August 1922).

Besides combat against the Whites and the Poles, he was also involved in the defeat of Nestor Makhno and Stanisław Bułak-Bałachowicz and acted as assistant to Mikhail Tukhachevsky during the Tambov Rebellion in 1921–1922. From August to November 1922 he served as minister of war of the Far Eastern Republic and commander-in-chief of its People's Revolutionary Army. In the latter position, he oversaw the storming of Spassk-Dalny and the seizure of Vladivostok in October, and finally, the ouster from Primorsky Krai of the last major White forces in Russian territory, the Zemskaya Rat of Mikhail Diterikhs. From August to November he served in the Far Eastern Bureau of the Comintern.

Uborevich was a member of All-Russian Central Executive Committee from 1922 and was then, consecutively, commander of a series of military districts: Ural (June 1924 – January 1925); North Caucasus (January 1925 – 1927); Moscow (1928 – 18 November 1929); Belorussia (April 1931 – 20 May 1937); and Central Asia (20–29 May 1937). He also attended the military academy of the German General Staff twice (1927–1928 and June 1933). He had a close relationship with his counterparts in the Reichswehr, acquiring important information on German weapon developments. He was also a member of the Soviet Revolutionary Military Council (June 1930 – June 1931) and chief of armaments for the Red Army (November 1929 – April 1931). He acted a candidate member of the Central Committee of the All-Union Communist Party (Bolsheviks) from 1931 to 1937 and from 1934 was a member of the military council of the People's Commissariat of Defense of the Soviet Union.

Uborevich was arrested on May 29, 1937, and along with Tukhachevsky, August Kork, and others, was arraigned in the Case of the Trotskyist Anti-Soviet Military Organization on June 11, 1937. Judged guilty of espionage and sabotage by a clandestine military tribunal, he was sentenced to death and executed on the same day. During the Khrushchev Thaw he was posthumously rehabilitated by the Military Collegium of the Supreme Court of the Soviet Union on January 31, 1957.

Uborevich was survived by his wife Nina (née Maximova) and daughter Vladimira (Mira). Nina Uborevich was arrested in late 1937 and executed in 1941. Mira Uborevich was sent in an orphanage and later (in 1944) arrested and convicted. Her memoirs were published in 2008; in 2013 she was interviewed in a multi-part documentary for Russia-K TV channel.

References

Sources 

1896 births
1937 deaths
People from Utena District Municipality
People from Novoalexandrovsky Uyezd
Old Bolsheviks
Central Committee of the Communist Party of the Soviet Union candidate members
Soviet komandarms of the first rank
Lithuanian people of World War I
Russian military personnel of World War I
Soviet military personnel of the Russian Civil War
People of the Polish–Soviet War
Recipients of the Order of the Red Banner
Case of the Trotskyist Anti-Soviet Military Organization
Executed military personnel
Members of the Communist Party of the Soviet Union executed by the Soviet Union
Lithuanian people executed by the Soviet Union
Great Purge victims from Lithuania
Soviet rehabilitations